The Battle of Marj ar-Rum, also known as the Battle of Marj Dimashq, was a conflict between the Rashidun caliphate and the Byzantine Empire. The battle occurred shortly after the Battle of Fahl when the Byzantines attempted to recapture Damascus. Heraclius, the Byzantine emperor, sent two separate forces in the effort, one army led by Theodore the Patricius and a second army led by Shannash al-Rome. The Rashidun army led by Abu Ubaydah ibn al Jarrah and Khalid ibn al-Walid was ordered to assist Yazid ibn Abi Sufyan who was acting as the garrison commander of Damascus.

The battle consisted of two separate engagements, however, Muslim historians regard these conflicts as a single battle due to the fact that the fighting occurred concurrently and that Khalid participated in both engagements.

The battle is considered as a decisive victory for the Rashidun army as all the Byzantine commanders were killed and the threat of losing Damascus ended.

Background 
After the capture of Damascus, the Rashidun army split its forces as it continued the conquest of the Levant. Amr ibn al-Aas and Shurhabil ibn Hasana moved south to capture Palestine, while Abu Ubaidah and Khalid moved north to capture northern Syria. Such a deployment of the Muslim forces left Yazid ibn Abi Sufyan as the lone defender of Damascus. Sensing an opportunity to recover Damascus, Heraclius immediately sent an army under the command of Theodore the Patrician to recapture the city. Included in Theodore's army was a sizable cavalry. By the time that the Rashidun army learned of Theodore's movements, Abu Ubaydah and Khalid had defeated the Byzantines in Fahl and immediately move to intercept Theodore.

Shortly thereafter, Theodore was reinforced by Shannash al-Rome's army which also included a sizeable cavalry force. Ultimately the two opposing forces met west of Damascus at the plain of Marj ar-Rum where the two armies drew up and faced each other in battle formation, Theodore opposite Khalid and Shannash opposite Abu Ubaydah. After drawing up, each of the armies remained in battle formation waiting for the other to make the first move. When night fell, Theodore and his vice commander Sheodore quietly pulled back their troops under the cover of darkness to advance upon Damascus.

Battles 
In the morning at Marj ar-Rum, the battle began with a personal duel between the field commanders, wherein Shannash was slain by Abu Ubaydah. Thereafter the two armies engaged in prolonged, but balanced combat. During the battle it became apparent to the Muslims that a portion of the Byzantine force had slipped off and that Damascus was now under attack. At that time, Khalid and his mobile guard disengaged themselves and rushed to Damascus.

When the Byzantine force under the command of Theodore and Sheodore reached Damascus, Yazid bin Abi Sufyan immediately deployed his forces and engaged the Byzantines outside the city. Despite being outnumbered, Yazid and the Damascus garrison were able hold their position for a considerable time before starting to fall back. Fortunately for the Muslims, Khalid and his cavalry arrived at about that time attacking the Byzantines from behind. As so, the Byzantines were caught in an untenable position, squeezed between the two Muslim forces. In the fighting, Khalid killed Theodore in single combat. Ultimately, Sheodore was also killed and the Roman lines thrown into confusion. Eventually, the Byzantines fled the field. The news of the upset at Damascus quickly spread to the field at Marj ar-Rum causing the Byzantine forces to lose their nerve and retreat, ending the battle.

Aftermath 
After the battle, the army of the Rashidun caliphate immediately seized the weapons, clothes, and mounts of the Byzantines. Yazid divided the booty among his soldiers and Khalid. A week later, Abu Ubaida captured Baalbek (Heliopolis) where the Temple of Jupiter stood later sending Khalid to attack Emesa.

See also 
 Siege of Damascus (634)

Citations

References

General references

External links 
Battle of Marj ar-Rum(معركة مرج الروم) Arabic language 

Damascus
Damascus
Damascus
Damascus
Damascus
Marj ar-Rum
630s in the Byzantine Empire
Heraclius
Muslim conquest of the Levant
Medieval Jordan